The men's 4 × 100 metre medley relay competition of the swimming events at the 2011 Pan American Games took place on 21 October at the Scotiabank Aquatics Center. The defending Pan American Games champion was the United States.

This race consisted of eight lengths of the pool. Each of the four swimmers completed two lengths of the pool. The first swimmer had to touch the wall before the second could leave the starting block.

Records
Prior to this competition, the existing world and Pan American Games records were as follows:

Results
All times shown are in minutes.

Heats
The first round was held on October 21.

Final 
The final was held on October 21.

References

Swimming at the 2011 Pan American Games
4 × 100 metre medley relay